Song Yeming (born 1954) is a Chinese director. Song is noted for Charging Out Amazon, which earned him an Outstanding Film Award and an Outstanding Director Award at the Huabiao Awards and a Best Picture Award at the Golden Rooster Awards.

Biography
Born in Rongcheng, Shandong in 1954, Song Yeming graduated from Beijing Film Academy, majoring in Director department. He worked in August First Film Studio since 1973.

Filmography

Film

Television

Awards

References

1954 births
People from Rongcheng, Shandong
People from Weihai
Living people
Beijing Film Academy alumni
Film directors from Shandong